Archibald Bell (15 March 1868 – 8 February 1948) was a Guyanese cricketer. He played in five first-class matches for British Guiana in 1896/97.

See also
 List of Guyanese representative cricketers

References

External links
 

1868 births
1948 deaths
Guyanese cricketers
Guyana cricketers
Cricketers from Greater London